Ralph Dozier Crosby Jr. (born September 23, 1947) was president and CEO of EADS North America - now known as the Airbus Group, Inc - from 2002 to 2009. He is a board member of Airbus and of American Electric Power.

Studies 
Born in South Carolina, Crosby holds a Bachelor of Science in natural sciences from the United States Military Academy (1969). In 1976, he obtained a master's degree in international relations at the Graduate Institute of International Studies in Geneva. In 1977, he graduated with a master's degree in public administrative law from Harvard University.

Military career 
Before entering a civilian career, Crosby served as a U.S. Army officer in Germany, Vietnam, and in the United States. At the end of his military career, he served as military staff assistant to the vice president of the United States.

Beginning of civilian career at Northrop Grumman 
Crosby joined Northrop Grumman in 1981 as special assistant to the senior vice president of the marketing and technology department. In 1983, he was appointed director of the group's Washington D.C. office and became its vice-president and general manager in 1985. In 1991, he became vice-president of the business and advanced systems development branches of the B-2 department. He was appointed corporate vice president and general manager in 1994.

When in 1995 the company announced the merger of the military aircraft and B-2 departments, he was appointed deputy general manager of the military aircraft systems branch. In 1996, he became deputy general manager of the civil aircraft branch and he was called to the post of general manager B-2 in September of that year. Finally, he ended his career in the company after being appointed in 1998 president of the integrated systems branch.

Career at EADS 
Crosby was appointed member of the executive committee of EADS and chairman and CEO of EADS North America on September 1, 2002. In this capacity, he was responsible for strengthening EADS 'presence in the United States, concluding strategic alliances with North American companies and improving EADS' share of the U.S. market.

Awards 
Crosby is the recipient of the James Forrestal Award from the National Defense Industrial Association, and has been awarded Chevalier of the Légion d’Honneur of France.

References

1947 births
Living people
United States Military Academy alumni
Military personnel from South Carolina
United States Army officers
United States Army personnel of the Vietnam War
Graduate Institute of International and Development Studies alumni
Harvard Kennedy School alumni
American chief executives